Sholeh Boran (also Romanized as Sholeh Borān and Sholehborān; also known as Shīlīleh) is a village in Bozkosh Rural District of the Central District of Ahar County, East Azerbaijan province, Iran. At the 2006 census, its population was 583 in 103 households. The following census in 2011 counted 909 people in 158 households. The latest census in 2016 showed a population of 675 people in 178 households; it was the largest village in its rural district.

References 

Ahar County

Populated places in East Azerbaijan Province

Populated places in Ahar County